WCMC may refer to:

 WCMC (AM), a radio station (1230 AM) licensed to Wildwood, New Jersey, United States
 WCMC-FM, a radio station (99.9 FM) licensed to Holly Springs, North Carolina, United States
 WMGM-TV, a television station in Wildwood, New Jersey which held the call letters WCMC-TV from 1966 to 1981
 Weill Cornell Medical College in New York City, the medical college of Cornell University
 World Conservation Monitoring Centre of the United Nations Environment Programme